Abdominal Radiology is a monthly peer-reviewed medical journal published by Springer Science+Business Media and an official journal of the Society of Abdominal Radiology. According to the Journal Citation Reports, the journal has a 2021 impact factor of 2.886. The journal was formerly known as Abdominal Imaging. The editor-in-chief is C. Daniel Johnson.

References

External links

Radiology and medical imaging journals
Monthly journals
Publications established in 1976
English-language journals
Springer Science+Business Media academic journals